Vinland Grange Hall, in Vinland, Kansas, United States, was built in 1884.  It historically served as a meeting hall and as a business. It was listed, for its architecture, on the National Register of Historic Places in 2000.

See also
 The National Grange of the Order of Patrons of Husbandry

References

Buildings and structures in Douglas County, Kansas
Clubhouses on the National Register of Historic Places in Kansas
Cultural infrastructure completed in 1884
Grange buildings on the National Register of Historic Places
National Register of Historic Places in Douglas County, Kansas